Raffaella Reggi was the defending champion, but did not compete this year.

Emanuela Zardo won the title by defeating Petra Ritter 7–5, 6–2 in the final.

Seeds

Draw

Finals

Top half

Bottom half

References

External links
 Official results archive (ITF)
 Official results archive (WTA)

Ilva Trophy
1991 WTA Tour